Stadium Arena may refer to:

Stadium Arena (Denver), Colorado, United States, a Denver Landmark
 DeltaPlex Arena in Walker, United States
 Stadium Arena (Norrköping) in Norrköping, Sweden